This is a list of schools in Portsmouth, in the English county of Hampshire.

State-funded schools

Primary schools

Ark Ayrton Primary Academy, Southsea
Ark Dickens Primary Academy, Buckland
Arundel Court Primary Academy, Landport
Beacon View Primary Academy, Paulsgrove
Bramble Infant School, Southsea
Copnor Primary School, Copnor
Corpus Christi RC Primary School, North End
Cottage Grove Primary School, Southsea
Court Lane Infant Academy, Cosham
Court Lane Junior Academy, Cosham
Craneswater Junior School, Southsea
Cumberland Infant School, Southsea
Devonshire Infant School, Southsea
Fernhurst Junior School, Southsea
The Flying Bull Academy, Buckland
Gatcombe Park Primary School, Hilsea
Highbury Primary School, Cosham
King's Academy College Park, Copnor
King's Academy Northern Parade, Hilsea
Langstone Infant School, Milton
Langstone Junior Academy, Milton
Lyndhurst Junior School, North End
Manor Infant School, Fratton
Mayfield School, North End
Medina Primary School, Cosham
Meon Infant School, Milton
Meon Junior School, Milton
Milton Park Primary School, Milton
Moorings Way Infant School, Southsea
New Horizons Primary School, North End
Newbridge Junior School, North End
Penhale Infant School, Fratton
Portsdown Primary School, Cosham
St George's Beneficial CE Primary School, Portsea
St John's Cathedral RC Primary School, Landport
St Jude's CE Primary School, Southsea
St Paul's RC Primary School, Cosham
St Swithun's RC Primary School, Southsea
Solent Infant School, Farlington
Solent Junior School, Drayton
Southsea Infant School, Southsea
Stamshaw Infant Academy, Stamshaw
Stamshaw Junior School, Stamshaw
The Victory Primary School, Paulsgrove
Westover Primary School, Milton
Wimborne Primary School, Southsea

Secondary schools

Admiral Lord Nelson School, Copnor
Ark Charter Academy, Landport
Castle View Academy, Paulsgrove
Mayfield School, North End
Miltoncross Academy, Milton
The Portsmouth Academy, Fratton
Priory School, Southsea
St Edmund's Catholic School, Landport
Springfield School, Drayton
Trafalgar School, Hilsea
UTC Portsmouth, Hilsea

Special and alternative schools
Cliffdale Primary Academy, North End
The Harbour School, Tipner
Mary Rose Academy, Southsea
Redwood Park Academy, Cosham

Further education
Highbury College, Cosham
Portsmouth College, Baffins

Independent schools

Senior and all-through schools
Madani Academy, Buckland
Mayville High School, Southsea
Portsmouth Grammar School, Old Portsmouth
Portsmouth High School, Southsea
St John's College, Southsea

Portsmouth
Schools in Portsmouth
Schools